The Orenda PS.13 Iroquois was an advanced turbojet engine designed for military use.  It was developed by the Canadian aircraft engine manufacturer Orenda Engines, a part of the Avro Canada group. Intended for the CF-105 Arrow interceptor, development was cancelled, along with the Arrow, in 1959.

Design history

For the CF-105 Arrow project, Avro Canada had originally intended to use one of three different engines, all UK designs: Rolls-Royce RB.106, the Bristol B.0L.4 Olympus, or a license-built version of the Olympus, the Curtiss-Wright J67. The RB.106 and J67 were selected as the primary and backup engines for the new design. However, both the RB.106 and J67 were cancelled during the Arrow's design phase, too far into the program to select the Olympus. Orenda Engines quickly responded with the PS.13 Iroquois design.

In overall design terms, the PS.13 was similar to the RB.106, using a "two-spool" layout with low-pressure and high-pressure sections of the compressor for added efficiency. It differed slightly in being somewhat more powerful, especially in afterburner. The design also incorporated a number of new design features intended to improve simplicity and lightness. With this in mind, Orenda pioneered work in the use of titanium in engines, with 20% by weight of the Iroquois (mainly the compressor rotor blades) consisting of this metal. Titanium has light weight, high strength and good temperature and corrosion resistance. It was estimated that the engine would be  lighter than if steel had been used. During the early 1950s, this material was in short supply, and the lack of knowledge of its physical properties and fabrication techniques created problems which had to be overcome. It was also very expensive relative to the more common materials such as steel and aluminum.

It was recognized that if the engine parts could be designed with titanium, then the supporting structure could also be lightened due to reduced forces within the engine, with an overall saving in weight. Other parts, such as gearbox casings were made with a magnesium alloy. Inconel was used to make the blades in the low pressure turbine assembly and the metal insulation blanket found at the rear of the engine. This heat resistant nickel-chrome alloy retains its strength at high temperatures and resists oxidation and corrosion. The primary reason for using these advanced metals was to save weight and improve performance, creating an engine with a 5:1 thrust to weight ratio that could produce a sea level dry thrust of 19,250 lb (26,000 lb with afterburner).

Testing
Wind tunnel tests demonstrated the engine's successful operation under sustained high inlet temperatures, and the ability to make normal relights up to 60,000 ft (18,290 m), the limit of the wind tunnel in which the tests were conducted. By 1958, the Iroquois had completed more than 5,000 hours of ground running, and many thousands of hours had also been spent testing the engines' principal components, at the Orenda testing facilities at Nobel, near Parry Sound, Ontario.

In 1956, an American Boeing B-47 Stratojet was loaned to the Royal Canadian Air Force to flight test the Iroquois for use in the CF-105. Canadair, the sub-contractor, attached an Iroquois to the right side of the bomber's rear fuselage, near the tail, simply because there was no other place to mount it. Designated CL-52 by Canadair, it was a nightmare to fly, since the thrust was asymmetrical; this created great problems for flight control. After the Arrow project was cancelled, the B-47B/CL-52, which had logged about 35 hours of engine flight tests, was returned to the U.S and subsequently scrapped. The CL-52 was the only B-47 used by any foreign service.

The program was cancelled, along with the Arrow, on 20 February 1959.

Surviving examples

The Canada Aviation and Space Museum in Ottawa houses the nose and cockpit section of Arrow RL 206, along with various wing and fuselage components, and a complete Iroquois-2 engine, Serial Number 117. An example of an Iroquois-1 engine is found at the Canadian Warplane Heritage Museum in Mount Hope, near Hamilton, Ontario. Another Iroquois-2 engine Serial Number 116 is owned by a private collector in Fort St. John, British Columbia.

Specifications (Iroquois 2)

See also

References

Notes

Bibliography

 Magellan Aerospace Corporation's Magellan Repair, Overhaul & Industrial - formerly Orenda.  Toronto: Magellan Aerospace Corporation.
 Rossiter, Sean. The Chosen Ones: Canada's Test Pilots in Action. Vancouver: Douglas & McIntyre, 2002. .
 Zuuring, Peter. Iroquois Rollout. Kingston, Ontario: Arrow Alliance Press, 2002. .

External links

 The Orenda Iroquois (National Aviation Museum)
 Paul B. Dilworth
 "Iroquois" a 1957 Flight article

1950s turbojet engines